Carlos Alcaraz Garfia (born 5 May 2003) is a Spanish professional tennis player. He is currently ranked as the world No. 1 player in men's singles by the Association of Tennis Professionals (ATP). Alcaraz has won eight ATP Tour-level singles titles, including the 2022 US Open and three Masters 1000 titles. With the US Open win, Alcaraz became the youngest man to top the singles rankings at 19 years, 4 months and 6 days old, and the first teenager in the Open Era to top the men's rankings.

As a junior, Alcaraz was ranked as high as world No. 22 and won two titles on the ITF Junior Circuit. After turning professional in 2018, he won three titles on the ITF Men's World Tennis Tour and four on the ATP Challenger Tour and broke into the top 100 in rankings in May 2021. Two months later, Alcaraz reached his first ATP Tour final at the 2021 Croatia Open, an ATP 250 tournament, where he won his first title. He later entered the top 50 after reaching the quarterfinals at the following US Open and won the year-end 2021 Next Generation ATP Finals in Milan. After winning his first ATP 500 title at the Rio Open in February 2022, Alcaraz won his first Masters 1000 title at the Miami Open and his second ATP 500 title at the Barcelona Open in April, propelling him into the top 10.

Early life
Carlos Alcaraz Garfia was born on May 5, 2003, in El Palmar, Murcia, Spain to parents Carlos Alcaraz González and Virginia Garfia Escandón. He has three siblings. He started playing tennis at the Real Sociedad Club de Campo de Murcia where his father was the tennis academy director. In 2018, he began playing at Juan Carlos Ferrero's Equelite JC Ferrero Sport Academy.

Professional career

2020: ATP debut
In February 2020, at the age of 16, Alcaraz made his ATP main-draw debut at the Rio Open after receiving a wildcard for the singles main draw. There, he defeated Albert Ramos Viñolas. Alcaraz was ultimately defeated in the second round by Federico Coria.

2021: First title, Next Gen champion, top 35

At age 17, Alcaraz qualified for the main draw of the Australian Open, making him the youngest participant in the men's singles. He won his Grand Slam debut defeating fellow qualifier Botic van de Zandschulp in straight sets before losing in the second round to Mikael Ymer.

Alcaraz became the youngest match winner in the Madrid Open's history, defeating Adrian Mannarino as a wildcard and breaking then-18-year-old Rafael Nadal’s record from 2004. In the second round, he lost to five-time champion Nadal on Alcaraz's 18th birthday.
By winning the biggest title of his career until then at the 2021 Open de Oeiras III Challenger tournament, he entered the top 100 as the youngest player at the age of 18 on 24 May 2021.

At the French Open, Alcaraz reached the third round of a Grand Slam for the first time in his career by defeating Nikoloz Basilashvili.

In July 2021, he reached his first ATP final at the 2021 Croatia Open Umag, defeating top seed Albert Ramos-Viñolas. He then won his maiden ATP title by defeating Richard Gasquet and becoming the youngest tour-level champion since 18-year-old Kei Nishikori won the Delray Beach Open in 2008. Alcaraz was the youngest Spaniard to win an ATP Tour title since Nadal claimed his first trophy in Sopot in 2004.

At Wimbledon, he lost in the second round to Daniil Medvedev. At the Winston-Salem Open, Alcaraz reached the round of 16 defeating qualifier Alexei Popyrin, and his second tour-level quarterfinal of the season defeating fourth seed Marton Fucsovics. He defeated Marcos Giron to reach the semifinals, where he lost to Mikael Ymer.

At the US Open, Alcaraz defeated world No. 3 Stefanos Tsitsipas in a fifth-set tiebreak to reach the fourth round in the biggest win of his career. At 18 years of age, Alcaraz became the youngest man in a Grand Slam fourth round since 17-year-old Andrei Medvedev at the 1992 French Open, and the youngest man in the US Open fourth round since 17-year-old Michael Chang and 18-year-old Pete Sampras in 1989. He then reached the quarterfinals by defeating qualifier Peter Gojowczyk. Alcaraz became the youngest US Open men's quarterfinalist in the Open Era, the youngest at the tournament since 18-year-old Thomaz Koch in 1963, and the youngest Grand Slam men's singles quarterfinalist since 18-year-old Michael Chang at the 1990 French Open. He then lost to Félix Auger-Aliassime via retirement in the second set in the quarterfinals after injuring his leg.

At the Erste Bank Open, Alcaraz defeated world No. 7 Matteo Berrettini, marking his second win over a top-10 player. As a result, he made his debut as the youngest player in the top 35 on 1 November. During his Paris Masters run, Alcaraz defeated French wildcard Pierre-Hugues Herbert in three thrilling sets in the first round. He then defeated Jannik Sinner in straight sets in the second round, marking his third win over a top-10 player. In the third round, he was defeated by Hugo Gaston in straight sets.

At the Next Gen ATP Finals, Alcaraz defeated Brandon Nakashima, Juan Manuel Cerúndolo, and Holger Rune in the round-robin stage. He advanced to the semifinals undefeated, where he defeated Sebastian Baez. He then advanced to the final, where he defeated Sebastian Korda to win the championship.

2022: US Open champion, youngest ever world No. 1 and year-end world No. 1

Seeded for the first time in a Grand Slam at No. 31, Alcaraz reached the third round of the Australian Open before losing in five sets to Matteo Berrettini. 

Seeded seventh at the Rio Open, Alcaraz won his first ATP 500 title defeating Diego Schwartzman in the final. As a result, he made his debut into the top 20 in the singles rankings on 21 February 2022. In Indian Wells, Alcaraz reached his first Masters 1000 quarterfinal and semifinal, defeating the defending champion Cameron Norrie before losing to Rafael Nadal.

Seeded 14th at the Miami Open, Alcaraz defeated 6th seed Casper Ruud to win his first Masters 1000 title. He became the youngest men's champion in the tournament's history.

At the Monte-Carlo Masters, Alcaraz lost in the second round to Sebastian Korda. At the Barcelona Open, Alcaraz defeated top seed Stefanos Tsitsipas in the quarterfinals to enter the top 10 in rankings for the first time on 25 April. He became the 20th teen to break into top 10 overall since rankings were established in 1973, and the youngest since Rafael Nadal also on 25 April 2005. Alcaraz later defeated Pablo Carreño Busta to win the title.

A day after his 19th birthday at the Madrid Open, he defeated 5-time Madrid champion, world No. 4 and third seed Rafael Nadal in the quarterfinals to become the first teenager to defeat him on clay. The following day, he went on to beat the world No. 1 and top seed Novak Djokovic in the semifinals for his 6th straight top-10 win, and became the youngest player to win a match against a world No. 1 since 2004. He also became the first player to ever beat Djokovic and Nadal back-to-back on clay. In the final, he went on to win his fourth title for the season (and second Masters 1000) defeating defending champion and world No. 3 Alexander Zverev thereby defeating the top three seeds in three consecutive matches. He also became the youngest champion in tournament history. As a result, he climbed to a career-high of world No. 6 in the rankings on 9 May 2022.

Following his withdrawal from the Italian Open due to an ankle injury, Alcaraz made his seeded debut at the French Open as No. 6. Having won two of the tour's biggest titles on clay coming into the Slam, he was widely projected to be one of the favorites for the title. He defeated Juan Ignacio Londero in straight sets before saving a match point in a second round five-setter against Albert Ramos Viñolas. He then defeated Korda and Karen Khachanov in straight sets before losing to Zverev, in the second Grand Slam quarterfinal of his career.

At Wimbledon, Alcaraz beat Jan-Lennard Struff in a close five set match before defeating Tallon Griekspoor and Oscar Otte in straight sets, reaching the round of 16 for the first time at this major. He lost to Jannik Sinner in the fourth round.

At the Hamburg Open, he reached the final, resulting in a new career-high of world No. 5 on 25 July 2022. Alcaraz became the youngest player to enter the top 5 in rankings since Nadal in 2005. He was defeated in the final by Lorenzo Musetti, resulting in the first loss in a tournament final of his career. At the Croatia Open, he reached his second consecutive final, resulting in another ranking jump to world No. 4 on 1 August. 

Alcaraz entered the 2022 US Open as the No. 3 seed. He defeated Sebastian Baez, Federico Coria and Jenson Brooksby without dropping a set to reach the fourth round. Next he defeated 15th seed Marin Cilic in five sets, becoming the youngest man to reach back-to-back quarterfinals at this Major in the Open Era. In his quarterfinal match he defeated Jannik Sinner, saving a match point in the fourth set. The match set the record as the latest finish (at 2:50AM EST) and second longest match (5 hours and 15 minutes) in US Open history. He defeated Frances Tiafoe in the semifinals for his third consecutive five-set match victory. He defeated 5th seed Casper Ruud in the final, where both players were in contention for the world No. 1 ranking, to win the title. Alcaraz became the youngest No. 1 in the history of the ATP Rankings at the age of 19 years, 4 months and 6 days, breaking Lleyton Hewitt's record. He also became the first teenager in the Open Era to top the men's rankings and the youngest men's US Open champion since Pete Sampras in 1990. 

In his first match as world No. 1, Alcaraz lost his singles match at the 2022 Davis Cup Finals to Felix Auger-Aliassime. Next, he lost to David Goffin at the Astana Open in his opening round. Alcaraz reached the semifinals in Basel, where he was defeated by the eventual champion Felix Auger-Aliassime for a second time this season. At the Paris Masters, Alcaraz reached the quarterfinals after defeating Yoshihito Nishioka and Grigor Dimitrov, but retired while being a set down against Holger Rune. A day later, Alcaraz announced he had suffered an abdominal tear requiring a six-week layoff, forcing him to end his season early. Alcaraz withdrew from the ATP Finals and the Davis Cup Finals. Alcaraz, at the age of 19 years and 214 days, ended the year as youngest and first teenager world No. 1.

2023: Golden Swing title and tenth final as a teenager, 100th career win

On 7 January, Alcaraz announced his withdrawal from the Australian Open due to a hamstring injury he suffered in his right leg while training. Following the tournament, he lost the world No. 1 ranking to the champion Novak Djokovic. He held the ranking for a total of 20 weeks.

In his first tournament back for the 2023 season at the Golden Swing in South America, Alcaraz won his seventh title at the Argentina Open in Buenos Aires, defeating second seed Cameron Norrie. He became the first teenager to win the event. Defending his title at the Rio Open, he reached back to back finals, and his tenth overall as a teenager tied with Jimmy Connors, Michael Chang and Lleyton Hewitt. He defeated Chilean qualifier Nicolás Jarry to reach the final, where he played against Cameron Norrie again, but lost. Alcaraz was additionally scheduled to play in Acapulco in the month of February, but withdrew prior to the tournament after suffering another hamstring injury.

At the 2023 BNP Paribas Open he recorded his 100th career win defeating 31st seed Tallon Griekspoor to reach the fourth round making him the second fastest player to reach this milestone after John McEnroe and faster than the Big 3. He reached the quarterfinals after the retirement of Jack Draper. Next he defeated eight seed Félix Auger-Aliassime and eleventh seed Jannik Sinner to reach the final. He won his eight career title over fifth seed Daniil Medvedev, without dropping a set for the first time since 2017 when Roger Federer won the title in Indian Wells. He became the ninth and youngest man to win both legs of the Sunshine Double. As a result he returned to world No. 1 on 20 March 2023.

Endorsements
Alcaraz is sponsored by Nike for clothing and shoes, and by Babolat for racquets, using the Babolat Pure Aero VS racquet. In January 2022, he became a brand ambassador for Rolex. He is also a brand ambassador for dermocosmetics company Isdin, Spanish food company ElPozo, and German automobile manufacturer BMW under their BMW Spain division. In January 2023, he became ambassador for the american clothing brand Calvin Klein especially for their 1996 underwear campaign.

Playing style
Alcaraz is an all-court, all-round tennis player, but primarily employs an aggressive baseline style of play, with an emphasis on a high winner count from his forehand, typically his most reliable and potent shot. He can either hit his forehand flat and fast for winners from every court position, or add a great amount of topspin and margin over the net. He also possesses a well-rounded and more flat and lower net-clearance backhand groundstroke that he is able to redirect down the line for clean winners. His greatly disguised drop shot is key to his game, as he often combines the heaviness of his groundstrokes that pushes his opponents back into the court into a defensive position, with a drop shot that is often too well-placed and disguised to deal with. He has an impressive net-game with great drop volleys and drive volleys, and frequently serve-and-volleys on crucial points.

His first serve is hit at high speeds with little emphasis on service box placement, typically at around 210 km/h (130 mph). This has led to some criticism of his serving. However, he has an excellent and reliable second serve to which he can add topspin, in order to get a high bounce off the court and either push back or get a weak return from closer-returning opponents. This serve typically reaches 150 to 170 km/h (93 to 106 mph). 

Alcaraz has earned acclaim for his remarkable athletic and physical traits. In particular, his direct sprints, counterattacking abilities from often indefensible positions on court, and an extremely high peak footspeed which has earned him comparisons to a young Rafael Nadal and Gaël Monfils. He has earned comparisons to Novak Djokovic for his assured lateral movement and court-coverage aided by physical splits and sliding through the court on defense, particularly on his backhand side where he is often able to neutralize his opponent's groundstroke aggression or drop shot attempts. He has also earned comparisons, on occasion, to Roger Federer for his great footwork and ability to go inside-out on his forehand and control the court with his offense.

Career statistics

Grand Slam tournament performance timeline

Current through the 2022 US Open.

Grand Slam finals

Singles: 1 (1 title)

Records

All-time records

Open Era records

Awards
ATP Newcomer of the Year (2020)
ATP Player of the Year (2022)
ATP Most Improved Player (2022)

See also
List of ATP number 1 ranked singles tennis players (since 1973)
Top ten ranked male tennis players
List of Grand Slam men's singles champions
World number 1 ranked male tennis players (all time, based on recognized tennis authorities)
ATP Awards

Explanatory notes

References

External links

 
 
 
 
 

2003 births
Living people
Spanish male tennis players
Sportspeople from Murcia
Tennis players from the Region of Murcia
US Open (tennis) champions
Grand Slam (tennis) champions in men's singles
ATP number 1 ranked singles tennis players
21st-century Spanish people